Chang Chao-chun (born 1 December 1966) is a Taiwanese gymnast. He competed in seven events at the 1988 Summer Olympics.

References

1966 births
Living people
Taiwanese male artistic gymnasts
Olympic gymnasts of Taiwan
Gymnasts at the 1988 Summer Olympics
Place of birth missing (living people)